Ergostine is an ergoloid-like chemical made by Claviceps purpurea.

References

Lysergamides